Bryce Crawford Walmsley (2 August 1881 – 21 June 1930) was an Australian politician.

He was born at Port Adelaide to engineer James Walmsley and Agnes, née Crawford. He grew up in Albury and moved to Sydney in 1902, where he worked with an accounting firm until 1920. On 11 October 1918 he married Jessie Elsie Dunn Munro, with whom he had three children. In 1927 he was elected to the New South Wales Legislative Assembly as the Nationalist member for Lane Cove, serving until his death at Lindfield in 1930.

References

 

1881 births
1930 deaths
Nationalist Party of Australia members of the Parliament of New South Wales
Members of the New South Wales Legislative Assembly
Politicians from Sydney
People from Adelaide
20th-century Australian politicians